Linum trigynum, the French flax, is a species of annual herb in the family Linaceae. It is native to Southern Europe, Western Asia, North Africa, the Horn of Africa and some oceanic islands, such as Madeira, Canary Islands and Socotra. They have a self-supporting growth form. Individuals can grow to 0.18 m tall.

Sources

References 

trigynum
Flora of Europe
Flora of Western Asia
Flora of the Arabian Peninsula
Flora of North Africa
Flora of Macaronesia
Flora of Northeast Tropical Africa